Valmiki National Park is a Tiger Reserve in the West Champaran District of Bihar, India. It is the only national park in Bihar. As of 2018, there were 40 tigers in the Reserve.

History 
The extensive forest area of Valmikinagar (formally known as Bhainsa Lotan) was previously owned by the Bettiah Raj and Ramanagar Raj until the early 1950s. It was declared a Wildlife Sanctuary in 1978. Valmiki National Park was established in the year 1990. Total area of the park is about 335.65 Km2. Valmiki Wildlife Sanctuary and National Park is the 18th Tiger Reserve of the country. The Valmiki Tiger Reserve comprises the National Park and the  Wildlife Sanctuary.

Location 
It is located in West Champaran which derives its name from two words, Champa and Aranya, meaning forest of Champa trees. Geographically, it is situated between 83°0 50′ and 84°0 10′ E longitude and between 27°0 10′ and 27°0 03′ N latitude. In the north, the protected areas are bordered by Nepal's Chitwan National Park while the Indian state Uttar Pradesh bounds the sanctuary from western side. Bihar Government is turning 800 hectares of forest in VTR into Grassland making it India's biggest grassland.

Landscape

The landscape of VTR encompasses foothills ranges of Himalayan Sivaliks with mosaic of the cliffs, ridges, gorges, hills, streams and valleys; dense forests, open woodlands, grasslands, swamps and riverine fringe. Situated in Gangetic plains bio-geographic zone of the Country, the forest has combination of bhabar and terai tracts. Boulder and pebble deposits by the Himalayan rivers in foothills characterized the Bhabar tract while the finer sediments deposits feature Terai lands.

Foothills of Himalayan Terai outliers - a continuation of Shivaliks
Someshwar Hill Range and Dun Hill system with knife-edge ridges and precipitous slopes, cliffs, spurs, gorges, narrow valleys.

Bhabar - Dun tract
Older alluvium with sandy soil with variegated clay and loose boulder deposits and artesian flows; lateritic formations on higher contours and newer Alluvium on southern parts with reissuing springs akin to artesian flows.

Flood plains of Gandak and Burhi Gandak and their tributaries
Criss-crossing and meandering rivers, streams and rivulets, man-made canals; Swamps and Grasslands. River Gandak forms the western boundary of Valmiki wildlife sanctuary. It enters in India at Valmikinagar(formally known as BHAINSA LOTAN), where two rivulets Sonha and Pachnad joins it, forming a holy confluence ‘Triveni’. The river is called ‘Narayani’ in Nepal. Harha – Masan River system originates from the Valmiki Forests and forms Burhi Gandak River down south. River Pandai flows into Bihar (India) from Nepal in the eastern end of the Sanctuary and meets Masan. All these rivers with their precursor and tributaries namely Rohua, Kotrahia, Manor, Bhapsa, Koshil, Singha, Dhonghi, Ganguli, Dhoram are full of youth and verve. Their cascades in wanton and wayward playfulness while descending from hills ridges and gorges are enchanting. Meeting the planes they slowly mature to serene grandeur.

Fauna

Mammals
The wildlife found in the forest of VTR are the Bengal tiger, Indian rhinoceros, Asiatic black bear, Indian sloth bear, otter, Indian leopard, wild dog, wild water buffalo, and wild boar. There are several species of deer, including barking deer, spotted deer, hog deer, Sambar, blue bull. Apart from that the striped hyena, leopard cat, fishing cat, langur, monkey, flying squirrel, clouded leopard, Indian gaur, mongoose can also be sighted. The tiger's population in the Reserve was 10 in 2010, which increased to 22 in 2013 and then 40 in 2018.

There is site in Madanpur forest block on the main road from Madanpur to Valmikinagar where large number of Indian flying fox, a type of bat can be sighted any time.

Reptiles
The reptiles which are commonly found in VTR are pythons, King cobras, Krait, Banded kraits and domuha snakes (sand boas). Among aquatic reptiles, gharial, monitor lizard, etc. are found in VTR. Plenty of crocodiles are found near Belahwa Village which is adjacent to the VTR. Gharials are found in River Gandak, as would be the case with a river that connects to the Ganges.

Birds
At present 241 bird species have been reported from VTR. Some of the interesting birds of VTR are Nepal kalij pheasant, three-toed quail, paradise flycatcher, grey shrike, green willow warbler, tree pipit, white eye warbler, green barbet, waders, ibises, storks, pitta, plovers, snipes, pied hornbill, White-eared night heron, emerald dove. There are five types of green pigeons and purple wood pigeon found in VTR. In the night several owls, owlets, nightjars, etc. can be easily sighted.

Butterflies
The jungle of VTR abounds in various kinds of moth, caterpillars and butterflies. Some common butterflies like common Mormon, great Mormon, glassy tiger, great eggfly, club beak, grey pansy, lime butterfly, common crow can easily be sighted.

Flora

As per Champion and Seth classification, there are seven forest types found in VTR, which makes VTR a special destination for nature lovers.
 Bhabar – Dun Sal Forest
 Dry Siwalik Sal Forest
 West Gangetic Moist Mixed Deciduous Forest
 Khair – Sissoo Forest
 Cane Brakes
 Eastern Wet Alluvial Grassland
 Barringtonia Swamp Forest

Due to diverse topographical and edaphic factors, the reserve harbors varied vegetation types. The Botanical Survey of India has categorized seven vegetation types within the limits of the sanctuary and the national park:
 Moist mixed deciduous
 Open – land vegetation
 Sub-mountainous semi-evergreen formation
 Freshwater swamps
 Riparian fringes
 Alluvial grasslands and high hill savannah
 Wetlands

The important tree species found in valley area of VTR are Sal (Shorea robusta), Karam (Adina cardifolia), Asan (Terminalia tomentosa), Bahera (Terminalia bellirica), Asidh (Lagestromia parviflora), Simal (Salmelia malaberica), Satsal (Dalbergia latifolia), etc.

In hilly regions apart from Sal, Piyar (Buchanania cochinchinensis), Mandar (Dillenia aurea), Banjan (Anogeissus latifolia), Bhelwa (Semecarpus anacardium), Harra (Terminalia chebula), Bodera (Eugenia operculata), etc. tree species are found. There is a special attraction of cane brakes which is mainly found in Madanpur Forest block and it is good habitat for Tiger. Cane occurs in damp areas along all most all the nalas of Madanpur Range. In Hindi cane is known as BETTH and the name Bettiah (District Headquarters of West Champaran District) is derived from this BETTH.

There is a small isolated patch of Chir Pine (Pinus roxburghii) forest locally known as DHUP found in Raghia Forest block. Generally Chir Pine forest occurs at the altitude of 4000 ft. to 5000 ft. but here it is found between the altitudes of 1000 ft. to 1700 ft. which is unique.

The grasses found in VTR are munj (Tripidium bengalense, synonym Saccharum munja), Kans (Saccharum spontaneum), Elephant grass (Typha elephantina), Narkat (Phragmites karka), Vitiveria zizanioides, Imperata cylindrica, Choranth (Heteropogon contortus), Sabai (Eulaliopsis binata), etc. Climbers are also very common in VTR. The common species being Mahulan (Bauhinia vahlii) Mahai (Butea parviflora), Panilat (Vitis repanda), Ramdatwan (Smilax parviflora), and Arar (Acacia pinnate).

There are several medicinal plants found in VTR. Some of them are Satawar (Asparagus racemosus), Safed Musli, Dudhkoraiya (Holarrahena

antidysenterica), Amla (Emblica officinalis), Piper (Piper longum), etc.

Cultural diversity

The Valmiki landscape harbors vivid socio-cultural diversity. The Tharu people, a scheduled tribe, is the dominant community in the landscape. There are several theories on colonization of this community in the Himalayan terai. Their prime occupation is agriculture and staple food is rice. They are non-vegetarian and like chicken, pork, snails and fish and gents relish liquor locally prepared from jaggary. The primary language is Bhojpuri . Rama Navami is their main festival. They also maintain socio-cultural relationship with the Tharus of Nepal. Their population is around 2.5 lakh.

The scheduled tribes other than Tharu in the Valmiki landscape are collectively called Dhangar – which means retained labourer in Oraon dialect. Dhangar comprises four tribes: Oraon, Munda, Lohra and Bhuiya. The Dhangars were brought to area as agriculture labourers from the Chhotanagpur Hills. Each Dhangar tribe has its own dialect and they observe their traditional festivals. Currently their population is around 0.5 lakh.

Communities other than the tribes are called "Baaji". They are outsiders and involved in agriculture as well as small business in the villages. It serves as the only Indian tiger reserve in the state of Bihar.

See also
 Udaypur Wildlife Sanctuary

References

External links
 

Tiger reserves of India
National parks in Bihar
Protected areas of Bihar
Lower Gangetic Plains moist deciduous forests
Himalayan subtropical broadleaf forests
West Champaran district
1976 establishments in Bihar
Protected areas established in 1976